The 2021 European Championship was the 15th European Championship in American football. The preliminary round has been played around Europe from 21 September to 2 November 2019. The final round was scheduled to be played in 2020, but due to the COVID-pandemic it was postponed to 2021, and was played in August and October 2021. In 2021 6 out of the scheduled 12 games has not been played, including the semi-final between reigning champion France and Italy.

Group A, first round
The first round was played from 21 September to 2 November 2019. The 12 best teams from the previous championships have been selected to play in the top division, selected into three seeds. Top seed teams were the first 4 teams of the 2018 championship (France, Austria, Finland and Sweden), second tier contained the other 2  teams in the final round (Great Britain and Denmark) along with Italy and Serbia, third tier contained the Czech Republic, the Netherlands, Russia and Switzerland.

Division A

Division B

Division C

Division D

Group A, final stage

1–4

5–8

9–12

Group B

Note: Belgium stepped down from the Championship in 2020, so their both played games (victory against Israel and loss against Hungary) have been administrated as 0:35 losses. The Israel-Spain game was cancelled.

See also
International Federation of American Football

References

2021
2019 in American football
2021 in American football
October 2021 sports events in Europe